Thomas Ainscough (23 February 1865 – 20 November 1927) was a first-class cricketer.  He was born and died at Lancaster House, Parbold, Lancashire.

A left-handed batsman, he played for Lancashire County Cricket Club in two matches, one each in 1894 and 1906. He also played first-class cricket for Liverpool and District between 1891 and 1894. He scored two first-class half-centuries, with a best of 61 not out against Yorkshire.

References

1865 births
1927 deaths
English cricketers
Lancashire cricketers
Liverpool and District cricketers